Tim Stanfill (born 7 April 1989) is an American professional rugby union player. He plays as a winger for the Houston Sabercats in Major League Rugby, previously playing for San Diego Breakers in PRO Rugby and the United States national rugby union team internationally.

References

1989 births
Living people
Houston SaberCats players
San Diego Breakers players
Sportspeople from Vancouver, Washington
United States international rugby union players
United States international rugby sevens players